Jeff Mueller is an American vocalist and guitarist best known as a member of the math rock bands Rodan, Shipping News and June of 44. His bands have been critically recognized for being key forerunners in the development of post-rock, math rock and post-hardcore. Additionally, Mueller released a single solo album, entitled Fold and Perish, in 1999 on Monitor Records. He lives in New Haven, Connecticut.

Biography 
Jeff Mueller attended college at Kansas City, Missouri at the Art Institute of Kansas City for two years. While in high school, Mueller struck up a bond with guitarist Jason Noble, who shared his musical interests. In 1991 they founded the Hip Hop project King G & the J Krew. Along with Noble, Jeff Mueller founded the band Rodan in Louisville, Kentucky in 1992. The group released one album for Quarterstick Records, titled Rusty, in 1994. After Rodan dissolved in 1995, Mueller formed June of 44 with bassist Fred Erskine, drummer Doug Scharin and guitarist Sean Meadows. In 1996, he formed Shipping News with former Rodan bandmate Jason Noble.

Discography 
Fold and Perish (Monitor, 1999)

References

External links

Living people
American rock guitarists
American male guitarists
Math rock musicians
Post-hardcore musicians
Post-rock musicians
June of 44 members
Year of birth missing (living people)